Acacia linearifolia, commonly known as stringybark wattle or narrow-leaved wattle, is a shrub or tree of the genus Acacia and the subgenus Phyllodineae that is endemic to eastern Australia.

Description
It has dark-reddish glabrous branches that are sometimes scurfy. It has thin,  smooth, glabrous, green to grey-green phyllodes with a narrowly linear shape. The spherical densely packed flower-heads contain 20 to 26 golden coloured flowers. The seed pods that follow are raised on opposite sides over alternate seeds and usually constricted between the seeds.

Distribution
It is native to an area in the upper Hunter Valley of New South Wales from around Scone and Denman, New South Wales in the east to around Gulgong in the east with southerly outliers around Wagga Wagga. It is often found growing on the lower portions of sandstone hills in colluvial rocky sandy soils where it is often a part of dry sclerophyll forest and woodland communities.

See also
 List of Acacia species

References

linearifolia
Flora of New South Wales
Plants described in 1927
Taxa named by Joseph Maiden
Taxa named by William Blakely